Samantha's Law is an advocacy initiative in the Province of Alberta. Samantha Lauren Martin was born June 4, 1993 and died December 3, 2006. Samantha Martin was born with Tetrasomy 18p, a rare chromosome syndrome, resulting in global developmental delays, Autism and a Seizure disorder. In 2009 the House of Commons tabled the United Nations Convention on the Rights of Persons with Disabilities recognizing December 3 as International Day of Persons with Disability.

Background
Samantha Martin was in the custody of the Canadian government. She lived in a foster care facility in Alberta, Canada. On December 3, 2006, Samantha died at age 13 while a patient at Stollery Children's Hospital.

The Family Support for Children with Disabilities Program, delivered through the Family Support for Children with Disabilities Act and accompanying Regulation, recognizes children with special needs as legally distinct from children in protective services under the intervention model. Government funding under that program is made available to families directly in order to prevent the need for guardianship relinquishment and out-of-home placement to achieve necessary medical supports.

The Family Support for Children with Disabilities (FSCD) program is not connected with Child Intervention Services. FSCD is delivered under Alberta's Ministry of Community and Social Services. 

Upon Samantha Martin’s medical prognosis, Government Representatives instructed the family that custody must be surrendered in order to gain access to funding for necessary medical services. Tragically, Samantha Martin was not provided the supports promised and died. A review of Child Welfare Act review occurred in 2002. Families of children with disabilities and other key stakeholders stated that children with disabilities were not able to access the support they needed through Child Welfare Act. The consultation during the review included parents of children with disabilities, community stakeholders, advocates, health care professionals and service providers. The Family Support for Children with Disabilities Act came into effect on August 1, 2004, replacing Section 106 of the Child Welfare Act.

The idea behind the concept of Samantha’s Law is promotion of equality, honour of human rights and dignity. In the absence of abuse or neglect, loving families tasked with extraordinary developmental or medical diversity must not be grouped amongst the Child Intervention Model. Rather, families are to be supported directly with in-home supports; not be coerced into relinquishing custody - whether temporary or permanent - in effort to secure Government funding for required services.

References and external links

Alberta provincial legislation
2009 in Alberta
2009 in Canadian law